Nicholas Hammond (born 3 February 1998) is an English cricketer. He made his first-class debut on 1 April 2018 for Loughborough MCCU against Sussex as part of the Marylebone Cricket Club University fixtures.

References

External links
 

1998 births
Living people
English cricketers
Loughborough MCCU cricketers
Sportspeople from Worcester, England
Herefordshire cricketers